Oreocyba is a genus of East African dwarf spiders that was first described by Å. Holm in 1962.

Species
 it contains two species:
Oreocyba elgonensis (Fage, 1936) (type) – Kenya, Uganda
Oreocyba propinqua Holm, 1962 – Kenya, Uganda

See also
 List of Linyphiidae species (I–P)

References

Araneomorphae genera
Linyphiidae
Spiders of Africa